The Daniel's catfish (Cochlefelis danielsi) is a species of catfish in the family Ariidae. It was described by Charles Tate Regan in 1908, originally under the genus Arius. It is found in brackish and freshwaters including rivers, lagoons and mangroves, in New Guinea. It feeds on shrimp and prawns of the genera Caridina and Macrobrachium.

References

Ariidae
Fish described in 1908